Yenişehir Spor Kulübü (in English: Yenişehir Sports Club) is a multi-sports club based in Ankara, Turkey.

History
The club was founded in Ankara in June 1953, and first began to show effectiveness in handball, basketball and football fields.

After the disappearance of Larissa district rapid urbanization financial hardship falls club by sponsoring sporting association agreements between the years 1977-1987 lived in 3 different with the company for 11 years. Club for two seasons from 1977-1979 year Meysu Yenişehir  name of the vehicle. Then İstanbul Bankası Yenişehir between 1979-1983, as a result of confiscation of State Istanbul Bank and then a short time remains sponsors a short time in finding a new sponsor in 1985-1987 and adopted the name Yenişehir Hortaş. Although cancel the sponsorship agreement at a general meeting held on 14 March 1986, the club's name was changed. February 20 extraordinary general meeting held in 1988. The club's name was first founded as when it was just Yenişehir and football branch was closed.

Honors

Handball 
 Men's Turkish League
 Winner (3) : 1983, 1984, 1985
 Women's Turkish League
 Winner (1) : 1984

References

Turkish Basketball Super League teams
Defunct basketball teams in Turkey
Turkish handball clubs
Basketball teams established in 1953
Sports clubs disestablished in 1988
Sport in Ankara